The Greenlandic Women's Handball Championship is a handball tournament to determine the National Champion from Greenland.

Results

Places from 1975 until 2004:

References

 
1975 establishments in Greenland